The Hollow is a 2016 American crime film, directed and written by Miles Doleac. The film won 3 awards (Best Actor, Supporting Actor, and Cinematography) at the 2016 Long Island International Film Expo.

Plot
When a U.S. congressman’s daughter, passing through a small town in Mississippi, dies in a mysterious triple homicide, a team of F.B.I. agents investigates. Lead agent, Vaughn Killinger (James Callis), battles personal demons as his partner, Sarah Desoto (Christiane Seidel), tries to hold him and the case together. They find a struggling and corrupt sheriff’s department, run by a chief deputy (Miles Doleac), who runs drugs for a shadowy figure, John Dawson (William Forsythe), who seems to be pulling all of the town’s strings from his antebellum mansion on the outskirts of town.

Cast
James Callis as Vaughn Killinger
Jeff Fahey as Darryl Everett
William Sadler as Sheriff Beau McKinney
William Forsythe as Big John Dawson
Christiane Seidel as Sarah Desoto
David Warshofsky as Principal Adam Markey
Miles Doleac as Ray Everett
Candice Michele Barley as Trisha Everett

Reception
The film received mixed reviews from critics. Review aggregator Rotten Tomatoes reports an approval rating of 40%, with an average rating of 5.2/10, based on 5 reviews.

Awards

References

External links

2016 films
2016 crime films
2010s English-language films